The North and East Island group is a group of islands in the Blenheim Reef region of the Chagos Archipelago. The present-day atoll of Baxio Predassa forms the remnant of the group. The group consists of about thirty-five islands, of which thirty-two are submerged. The main islands are as follows:

Ile Medaille (SUBMERGED) 
Ilot Bajinne (SUBMERGED) 
Ilot Chats (SUBMERGED)
Ile Topaze (SUBMERGED) 
Ile Thorpe (SUBMERGED) 
Ile Verte (SUBMERGED)
Ile Velo (SUBMERGED) 
Ile Cipaye (SUBMERGED)
Ile Vingt-Cinq (SUBMERGED)
Ile Du Nord 
Ile Du Milieu 
Ile De L'Est 
Ile Du Sud
Ile Bateau (SUBMERGED) 
Ile Coco (SUBMERGED) 
Ile Grenade (SUBMERGED)
Ilot Dubaire (SUBMERGED)
Ile Boucherier (SUBMERGED)
Ile Lubine (SUBMERGED)
Ile Aux Vaches (SUBMERGED)
Ile Aux L'Herbes (SUBMERGED)
Ile De La Mere (SUBMERGED)
Ile Pannacca (SUBMERGED)

The islands were linked to the larger South and West Island group

Chagos Archipelago